Edward Payson Bassford (1837–1912) was an architect who practiced in St. Paul, Minnesota, in the late 19th century. Born in Calais, Maine, on June 7, 1837, he moved to St. Paul in 1866. He worked in the office of Abraham Radcliffe for a time, then founded his own architectural firm. By the 1870s, Bassford was the busiest architect in St. Paul, working on designs for houses, schools, and many commercial buildings.  His firm also employed architects who later were famous in their own right, such as Cass Gilbert, Augustus Gauger, Edward J. Donohue, Silas Jacobson, and Charles Bassford. He died in Osakis, Minnesota, on July 20, 1912.

Works 
Several of Bassford's designs are listed on the National Register of Historic Places.  These include:
 John M. Armstrong House, 225 Eagle Parkway, St. Paul, MN
 Frederic A. Donahower House 1873, Minnesota Avenue and Locust Street, St. Peter, MN
 The Murray-Lanpher House in Irvine Park Historic District, St. Paul, MN
 Merchants National Bank (Saint Paul), 366-368 Jackson Street, St. Paul, MN
 Nicollet County Courthouse and Jail, 501 S, Minnesota Ave., St. Peter, MN
 Nicollet House Hotel, Minnesota Ave. at Park Row, St. Peter, MN
 Old Main at Gustavus Adolphus College, Gustavus Adolphus College campus, St. Peter, MN
 Rochat-Louise-Sauerwein Block, 261–277 W. 7th St., St. Paul, MN
 SS Peter and Paul Catholic Church 1871, 4th and Mulberry, Mankato, MN
 Building(s) in St. Peter Commercial Historic District, Minnesota Ave. between Broadway and Grace Streets, St. Peter, MN
 Walsh Building, 189-191 E. 7th St., St. Paul, MN

 Other buildings
 Cathedral of St. Mary, North Broadway and 6th Avenue North, Fargo, North Dakota
 Saint Michael Church, Stillwater, Minnesota

References 

People from Calais, Maine
1837 births
1912 deaths
Architects from Saint Paul, Minnesota
Architects from Maine
19th-century American architects
20th-century American architects